Schizostoma laceratum is a fungus in the family Agaricaceae. It was first described in 1829 by Christian Gottfried Ehrenberg as Tulostoma laceratum, and transferred to the genus, Schizostoma, in 1846 by Joseph-Henri Léveillé.

References

Agaricaceae
Fungi described in 1829
Taxa named by Christian Gottfried Ehrenberg